The Menace is a 1932 American pre-Code American crime drama film directed by Roy William Neill. The screenplay by Roy Chanslor, Dorothy Howell, and Charles Logue is based on the 1927 novel The Feathered Serpent by Edgar Wallace.

Plot
Englishman Ronald Quayle was accused of murdering his father and, based on testimony offered by his stepmother Caroline, was found guilty and imprisoned. Managing to escape, he fled to the United States and found work in an oil field, where an explosion scarred his face. After undergoing plastic surgery, he returns home under the alias Robert Crockett, determined to prove Caroline and her lover Jack Utterson really killed his father.

Having squandered her inheritance, Caroline has put the Quayle home on the market. Pretending to be a potential buyer, Ronald introduces himself to Caroline. Meanwhile, Scotland Yard Inspector Tracy has assigned Ronald's former fiancée Peggy Lowel to inventory the contents of the house in the hope she will find evidence to clear Ronald's name.

Ronald initiates a romance with Caroline and, announcing his plan to elope to New York City with her, presents her with a magnificent necklace. At a Halloween party, Ronald plants the necklace on Caroline's cohort Sam Lewis, who is killed by Jack. He conceals the body in a sarcophagus, and after Ronald finds it he reports his discovery to Inspector Tracy. During the ensuing investigation of the crime, Ronald and Jack fight near a statue of a feathered serpent, which falls on Jack. As he lies dying, he confesses to murdering Ronald's father and implicates Caroline. Ronald is exonerated, and he and Peggy make plans to marry and settle in Quayle Manor.

Cast (in credits order)
H.B. Warner as Inspector Tracy
Walter Byron as Ronald Quayle / Robert Crockett
Bette Davis as Peggy Lowell
Natalie Moorhead as Caroline Quayle
William B. Davidson as John Utterson
Crauford Kent as Sam Lewis
Halliwell Hobbes as Phillips
Charles K. Gerrard as Bailiff
Murray Kinnell as Carr

Production
When Columbia Pictures purchased the film rights to Edgar Wallace's novel The Feathered Serpent, the author was working as a screenwriter at the studio, but the film adaptation's budget was so small it did not allow for Wallace to write the script at the salary he was drawing at the time. The film was shot in only eight days. Upon its completion, studio executives decided its title might mislead audiences into thinking it was an action adventure film instead of a murder mystery, so it was changed, first to The Squeaker and then The Menace.

Bette Davis, under contract to Universal Pictures, was loaned to Columbia for the small supporting role of Peggy Lowell. Also in the cast was Murray Kinnell, who recommended Davis to his close friend George Arliss when he was searching for an actress for the ingenue role in The Man Who Played God, which generally is acknowledged as the film that finally brought the actress to the attention of critics and the movie-going public.

Critical reception
Andre Sennwald of The New York Times stated, "The imaginative adaptation and sorrowful dialogue are probably to blame for the shortcomings of this film, for the situation has elements of suspense . . . The cast is quite satisfactory . . . But The Menace is hardly adult entertainment."

References

External links

1932 films
American crime drama films
Films based on British novels
Films based on crime novels
Films set in England
Columbia Pictures films
Films based on works by Edgar Wallace
American black-and-white films
Films directed by Roy William Neill
1932 crime drama films
1930s American films